The Social Insurance Institution is a Polish state organization responsible for social insurance matters which has been operating since 1934. ZUS is supervised by the Ministry of Labour and Social Policy. ZUS carries out the following tasks:
establishing entitlement to social insurance benefits,
paying out social insurance benefits,
assessing and collecting social insurance and health insurance contributions and contributions to the Labour Fund and the Fund of Guaranteed Employee Benefits,
maintaining individual accounts for those insured and the accounts of contribution payers.

ZUS is organized into field organizational units which include: branches, inspectorates and field offices. The national network of ZUS organizational units includes 325 units, of which 43 are branch offices, 216 are inspectorates and 66 are local offices.

References

External links
 
SOCIAL INSURANCE IN POLAND: information, facts - 2015 English language informational brochure by ZUS
Infolinia ZUS

Financial services companies established in 1934
Government agencies of Poland
Insurance companies of Poland
Social security in Poland
1934 establishments in Poland
Government agencies established in 1934
Welfare in Poland